Oreobates ibischi is a species of frog in the family Strabomantidae. It is endemic to Bolivia. Its natural habitats are subtropical or tropical dry forest, rural gardens, and heavily degraded former forest. It is threatened by habitat loss.

References

ibischi
Amphibians of Bolivia
Endemic fauna of Bolivia
Taxonomy articles created by Polbot
Amphibians described in 2001